A Turing tarpit (or Turing tar-pit) is any programming language or computer interface that allows for flexibility in function but is difficult to learn and use because it offers little or no support for common tasks. The phrase was coined in 1982 by Alan Perlis in the Epigrams on Programming:

In any Turing complete language, it is possible to write any computer program, so in a very rigorous sense nearly all programming languages are equally capable. However, having that theoretical ability is not the same as usefulness in practice. Turing tarpits are characterized by having a simple abstract machine that requires the user to deal with many details in the solution of a problem. At the extreme opposite are interfaces that can perform very complex tasks with little human intervention but become obsolete if requirements change slightly.

Some esoteric programming languages, such as Brainfuck, are specifically referred to as "Turing tarpits" because they deliberately implement the minimum functionality necessary to be classified as Turing complete languages.  Using such languages is a form of mathematical recreation: programmers can work out how to achieve basic programming constructs in an extremely difficult but mathematically Turing-equivalent language.

See also

 Greenspun's tenth rule
 Write-only language
 Zawinski's law of software envelopment

References

Further reading
 G. Fischer, A.C. Lemke,  "Constrained Design Processes: Steps Toward Convivial Computing", Technical Report CU-CS-369-87, Colorado University, USA.

 E.L. Hutchins, J.D. Hollan, D.A. Norman, .  Also found in 

 Esolangs, Turing Tarpit.

Alan Turing
Recreational mathematics
Theory of computation
Software engineering folklore